Tanybria costata is a species of leaf beetle of Cameroon and the Democratic Republic of the Congo, described by Martin Jacoby in 1898.

References

Eumolpinae
Beetles of Africa
Insects of Cameroon
Beetles of the Democratic Republic of the Congo
Taxa named by Martin Jacoby
Beetles described in 1898